Dicrocoelium hospes is a species of flatworms belonging to the family Dicrocoeliidae.

The species may cause the disease dicrocoeliasis.

References

Plagiorchiida
Animals described in 1907